Federal elections were held in Switzerland on 23 October 1983. The Free Democratic Party emerged as the largest party in the National Council, winning 54 of the 200 seats. It was the first time the Social Democratic Party had not received the most votes in a federal election since 1925.

The main issues included environmental protection and unemployment.

Results

National Council

By constituency

Council of the States

References

Switzerland
Federal
Federal elections in Switzerland
October 1983 events in Europe